Grimsley is a surname. Notable people with the surname include:

Chet Grimsley (born 1956), American football player
Crawford Grimsley (born 1967), American boxer and kickboxer
Denise Grimsley (born 1959), American politician
Greer Grimsley, American opera singer
Jack Grimsley, Australian musician
James Grimsley, Jr. (1921–2013), United States Army general
Jason Grimsley (born 1967), American baseball player
Jim Grimsley (born 1955), American writer
John Grimsley (1962–2008), American football player
Ross Grimsley (born 1950), American baseball player
Ross Grimsley (1950s pitcher) (1922–1994), American baseball player